Krikor Bedros XX Gabroyan, I.P.C.B. also known in English as Gregory Peter XX Gabroyan and in French as Grégoire Pierre XX Ghabroyan (14 November 1934 – 25 May 2021) was the Catholicos-Patriarch of Cilicia  of the Armenian Catholic Church after his election on 24 July 2015 and the necessary concession of the ecclesiastical full communion by Pope Francis one day later. He was enthroned on 9 August 2015.

Biography
Gabroyan felt a vocation for the priesthood and studied at Bzommar Patriarchal Monastery continuing at the Collège des frères maristes de Jounieh (Lebanon). He was sent to Italy to continue his higher studies at the Armenian Leonine Pontifical College in Rome and graduate studies in Philosophy and Theology at the Pontifical Gregorian University. Upon successful graduation, he returned to Lebanon and was ordained priest on 28 March 1959.

Gabroyan became an instructor in Bzommar Monastery School in 1960 and from 1962 to 1996 served as principal of the Armenian Catholic Mesrobian Secondary School in Bourj Hammoud and from 1969 to 1975 as head of the Bzommar Convent School and secretary to the Convent's executive council.

In 1976, he was appointed for serving the Armenian Catholics in France and was ordained as bishop on 13 February 1977 on the hand of Armenian Catholic Catholicos-Patriarch Hemaiag Bedros XVII Ghedighian serving as Apostolic Exarch in France from 1977 to 1986 and as Primate and Armenian Catholic Eparch and Bishop of France at the Éparchie Sainte-Croix-de-Paris des Arméniens, from 1986 to April 2013 date of his retirement from his duties. 
 
Upon the death of Armenian Catholic Patriarch Catholicos of Cilicia Nerses Bedros XIX Tarmouni on 25 June 2015, he served as administrator of the Church until election of a new Patriarch. The Armenian Catholic Holy Synod of Bishops convened starting 14 July 2015 and elected Gabroyan as Catholicos-Patriarch on 24 July 2015 under the name of Krikor Bedros XX Gabroyan.

He was enthroned on 9 August 2015 in Bzommar, Lebanon.

Krikor Bedros XX Gabroyan died on 25 May 2021 and his death was announced by the Pontificio Collegio Armeno online. On 29 May, Pope Francis issued a statement memorializing Gabroyan and imploring the intercession of St. Gregory of Narek, who was canonized in 2015.

See also
 List of Armenian Catholic Patriarchs of Cilicia

References

1934 births
2021 deaths
Members of the Patriarchal Congregation of Bzommar
21st-century Eastern Catholic bishops
20th-century Eastern Catholic bishops
Armenian Catholic Patriarchs of Cilicia
Armenian Eastern Catholics
Syrian Eastern Catholics
Syrian people of Armenian descent
French people of Armenian descent
People from Aleppo
Pontifical Gregorian University alumni